Duets is a compilation of duets by the country music artist Emmylou Harris in partnership with other well-known country and rock artists. Most of the twelve tracks on the album originally appeared as singles or on albums released by her singing partners. Several of the tracks attained positions on the Billboard Hot Country Singles charts: "That Lovin' You Feelin' Again" with Roy Orbison was at #6 in 1980; "If I Needed You" with Don Williams at #3 in 1981; "Wild Montana Skies" with John Denver at #14 in 1983; "Thing About You" with Southern Pacific at #14 in 1985; and "We Believe in Happy Endings" with Earl Thomas Conley at #1 in 1988. Also included is "Love Hurts", an early duet with Gram Parsons from his Grievous Angel album. Duets reached #24 on the country albums chart in 1990.

Track listing

Personnel 

Brian Ahern – arranger, producer
The Band – vocals
Earl Thomas Conley – vocals
Rick Danko – electric bass, vocals
John Denver – vocals, producer
Desert Rose Band – vocals
Rob Fraboni – producer
Garth Fundis – producer
Emory Gordy – producer
Caroline Greyshock – photography
Emmylou Harris – acoustic guitar, guitar, vocals
Bradley Hartman – producer, mastering, assembly
George Jones – vocals
Janet Levinson – art direction, design
Elliot Mazer – producer
Glenn Meadows – mastering assistant
Willie Nelson – vocals
Jim Ed Norman – producer
Milton Okun – executive producer
Roy Orbison – vocals
Gram Parsons – vocals, producer
Dolly Parton – harmony vocals
Robbie Robertson – producer
Larry Samuels – executive producer
Randy Scruggs – producer
Ed Seay – producer
Billy Sherrill – producer
John Simon – producer
Ricky Skaggs – vocals
Southern Pacific – vocals, producer
Don Williams – vocals, producer
Paul Worley – producer
Barney Wyckoff – producer
Neil Young – vocals

Chart performance

References

Vocal duet albums
Emmylou Harris compilation albums
1990 compilation albums
Reprise Records compilation albums